Group A of the 2000 Fed Cup Asia/Oceania Zone Group II was one of two pools in the Asia/Oceania Zone Group II of the 2000 Fed Cup. Five teams competed in a round robin competition, with the top two teams advancing to the play-off.

Pacific Oceania vs. Uzbekistan

Malaysia vs. Fiji

Pacific Oceania vs. Fiji

Malaysia vs. Iraq

Uzbekistan vs. Fiji

Pacific Oceania vs. Iraq

Uzbekistan vs. Malaysia

Fiji vs. Iraq

Uzbekistan vs. Iraq

Pacific Oceania vs. Malaysia

See also
Fed Cup structure

References

External links
 Fed Cup website

2000 Fed Cup Asia/Oceania Zone